Vexitomina sinensis is a species of sea snail, a marine gastropod mollusk in the family Horaiclavidae.

Distinguished from Vexitomina chinensis Ma, 1989, synonym of synonym of Paradrillia patruelis (E. A. Smith, 1875)

Description

Distribution
This species occurs in the Yellow Sea.

References

 Ma X. 1989. A new species of the Turridae (Mollusca: Prosobranchia) from the Yellow Sea. Stu Mar Sinica 30:163–165
 Ma X. 2004. Family Turridae. In: Qi Z, editor. Seashells of China. Beijing: Ocean Press.p. 110–113.

External links
  Tucker, J.K. 2004 Catalog of recent and fossil turrids (Mollusca: Gastropoda). Zootaxa 682:1–1295

sinensis
Gastropods described in 1989